Many politicians and lawyers from the state of Ohio have served in senior positions in the executive, legislative and judicial branches of the United States federal government. These have included seven Presidents, three Presidents of the Senate, two Speakers of the House of Representatives, and three Chief Justices of the United States.

Executive Branch

Presidents of the United States and Candidates

Vice Presidents of the United States and Candidates

Cabinet Secretaries

United States Ambassadors 

List of Ohioans Who Served as United States Ambassadors

Other Federal Officers

Legislative Branch

Senate

Presidents Pro Tempore of the United States Senate

Majority Leaders of the United States Senate 

None

Minority Leaders of the United States Senate

Democratic Leadership Office Holders (whips, conference chairmen, etc.) of the United States Senate

Republican Leadership Officer Holders (whips, conference chairmen, etc.) of the United States Senate

Chairmen of United States Senate Committees

United States Senators and Candidates

House of Representatives

Speakers of the United States House of Representatives

Majority Leaders of the United States House of Representatives

Minority Leaders of the United States House of Representatives 

None

Democratic Party Leadership Office Holders (whips, caucus chairmen, etc.) in the United States House of Representatives

Republican Party Leadership Office Holders (whips, conference chairmen, etc.) in the United States House of Representatives

Chairmen of United States House of Representatives Committees

United States Representatives and Candidates 

 List of Candidates for U.S. Representative from Ohio
 List of Candidates for U.S. Representative from Ohio, A-G
 List of Candidates for U.S. Representative from Ohio, H-M
 List of Candidates for U.S. Representative from Ohio, N-Z

Judicial Branch

Chief Justices of the United States

Associate Justices of the United States Supreme Court

Judges of United States Courts of Appeal

Judges of United States District Courts 

Lists of Ohio politicians